Carl Wayne Cotman is an American neuroscientist. He is a professor of neurology at the University of California, Irvine School of Medicine, where he is also the founding director of the Institute for Brain Aging and Dementia and the Institute for Memory Impairments and Neurological Disorders (UCI MIND). He is known for researching the neurochemistry of Alzheimer's disease and other forms of dementia. His research has shown, for example, that physical exercise increases production of brain-derived neurotropic factor, which protects neurons from aging-related damage and promotes the growth of new ones.

References

External links
Faculty page

Living people
American neurologists
American neuroscientists
University of California, Irvine faculty
Alzheimer's disease researchers
Neurochemists
Indiana University alumni
Year of birth missing (living people)
American biochemists